BRIC, formerly known as BRIC Arts Media or Brooklyn Information & Culture, is a non-profit arts organization based in Brooklyn, New York founded in 1979 as the "Fund for the Borough of Brooklyn". A presenter of free cultural programming in Brooklyn, it incubates and showcases work by artists and media-makers with programs reaching hundreds of thousands of people each year. 

Their main venue, BRIC House, is based in the Brooklyn Cultural District, and offers a public media center, a contemporary art exhibition space, two performance spaces, a glass-walled TV studio, and artist work spaces.

BRIC’s programs include the BRIC Celebrate Brooklyn! Festival in Prospect Park, a contemporary art exhibition series, and two distinct media initiatives: Brooklyn Free Speech, Brooklyn's Public Access initiative, and BRIC TV, a nonprofit community TV channel and digital network. BRIC also offers education and other programs at BRIC House and throughout Brooklyn.

BRIC House
Prior to the opening of BRIC House (in the former Strand Theater building on Fulton Street) in 2013, BRIC programmed in a number of locations around Brooklyn including the Rotunda Gallery in Brooklyn Heights. The 40,000-square-foot BRIC House, renovated by Leeser Architecture, allows BRIC to present music, arts and media programming under the same roof for the first time with a 3,000-square-foot public gallery, flexible performance space, and artist studios. 

Along with UrbanGlass (their upstairs neighbor), the Theatre for a New Audience, and the Mark Morris Dance Center, BRIC is considered a key part of the Downtown Brooklyn Cultural District which also includes the three buildings of the Brooklyn Academy of Music.

References

External links

Official website

Arts organizations based in New York City
Organizations based in Brooklyn
Arts organizations established in 1979
1979 establishments in New York City